Subplate Recordings is a Drum and Bass record label from Germany. The owner is Typecell.

Discography
  CDLP 01  	- Typecell  -	Voice Of Submission  -	(CD)  -  2004
Track listing:
01 	  	Attack Of The Clones (6:16)
02 	  	New World Order (5:28)
03 	  	Soul Defender (5:36)
04 	  	Higher Levels (5:07)
05 	  	Rise Of Anger (5:34)
06 	  	Die Wahrheit (5:29)
07 	  	Acid Air Raid (6:00)
08 	  	D@rkne55 (4:49)
09 	  	Insider (6:13)
10 	  	Trauma (4:50)
11 	  	You Make Me Sick (6:15)
12 	  	Voice Of Submission (5:09)
written & produced by Guido Hoppe @ Acidlab Studio Kassel Germany for Subplate Records

See also
 List of record labels

External links
 Website

German record labels
Electronic music record labels